Raven Software Corporation is an American video game developer based in Wisconsin and founded in 1990. In 1997, Raven made an exclusive publishing deal with Activision and was subsequently acquired by them. After the acquisition, many of the studio's original developers, largely responsible for creating the Heretic and Hexen: Beyond Heretic games, left to form Human Head Studios.

History

id Software
Raven Software was founded in 1990 by brothers Brian and Steve Raffel. Originally a three-person company, they were discovered by John Romero, co-founder of id Software, who collaborated with Raven to make games using their game engine beginning with ShadowCaster. Raven then started making games with id Software and even briefly moved to the same street as id Software. They used id's engines for many of their games, such as Heretic, Hexen: Beyond Heretic and Hexen II.

In 2005 and 2009, Raven developed two games from id's catalog: Quake 4 and Wolfenstein respectively.

Activision
The company was independent until 1997 when it was acquired by Activision for $12 million. They were still collaborating with id Software but at the same time developed other titles as well such as Soldier of Fortune in 2000, Star Wars Jedi Knight: Jedi Academy in 2003, X-Men Legends in 2004 and many more.

In August 2009, following poor performance and possible over-budget of Wolfenstein, the company made a major layoff of 30-35 staff, leaving two development teams. This was reduced to one after more layoffs in October 2010, after delays with Singularity; as many as 40 staff were released. Following the layoffs and after id Software was bought over by ZeniMax Media, Raven has since become a primary developer for the Call of Duty series.

In December 2021, Activision fired several members of the quality assurance (QA) department.  One of the associate managers said that "valuable members" were fired although they "were promised, for months, that Activision was working towards a pay restructure to increase their wages". Following these firings as well as other controversies revolving Activision Blizzard, a strike has been initiated. On January 21, 2022, Raven's QA team formed a union named the Game Workers Alliance with Communications Workers of America.

In May 2022, a group of quality assurance testers from Raven Software successfully organized a union known as the Game Workers Alliance, with the vote being 19 for and 3 against. In June 2022 Activision Blizzard CEO Bobby Kotick stated that the company would recognize the union and begin negotiations with it.

Games

In 2012, Raven began hiring employees for a game, and were announced as collaborating with Infinity Ward on Call of Duty: Ghosts in May 2013.

On April 3, 2013 following the closure of LucasArts, Raven Software released the source code for Star Wars Jedi Knight II: Jedi Outcast and Star Wars Jedi Knight: Jedi Academy on SourceForge under the GPL-2.0-only license.

In April 2014, the company became lead developer of the now shutdown free-to-play Chinese Call of Duty title, Call of Duty: Online. The company also remade Call of Duty 4: Modern Warfare, titled Call of Duty: Modern Warfare Remastered.

In 2020, Raven Software collaborated with Infinity Ward on the game Call of Duty: Warzone. The company is considered the face of maintaining, updating and debugging the game as they regularly provide status updates and patch notes on Twitter and their official website (though it is unclear if they are the sole studio responsible behind-the-scenes).

Raven developed Call of Duty: Black Ops Cold War with Treyarch, which released on November 13, 2020.

References

External links
 

1990 establishments in Wisconsin
1997 mergers and acquisitions
American companies established in 1990
Activision
Companies based in Madison, Wisconsin
Video game companies established in 1990
Video game companies of the United States
Video game development companies